Adrian Martinez (born January 7, 2000) is an American football quarterback for the Kansas State Wildcats. He previously played for the Nebraska Cornhuskers.

Early years
Martinez attended the Clovis West High School in Fresno, California. He played both football and basketball in high school. He missed his senior season of football due to a torn labrum he suffered while playing basketball. As a junior, he was the Fresno Bee football player of the year after he passed for 2,562 yards with 25 touchdowns and rushed for 1,462 yards and 14 touchdowns.

Martinez was regarded as a four-star prospect and was the seventh-highest-ranked dual-threat quarterback in the class of 2018 according to the 247Sports Composite. Martinez originally committed to play college football at the University of California, Berkeley and University of Tennessee before ultimately deciding on the University of Nebraska.

College career

2018
First-year Nebraska head coach Scott Frost named Martinez the starting quarterback heading into the 2018 season opener, making him the first true freshman to ever begin a season as the starting quarterback at Nebraska. In the Cornhuskers' opening game against Colorado, Martinez threw for 187 yards, one touchdown, and an interception, and added 117 rushing yards and two rushing touchdowns on the ground. Nebraska lost the game 33–28. Martinez went down with a knee injury in the final minutes of the Colorado game, an injury that also caused him to miss the following game against Troy, which also ended in a loss for Nebraska. Martinez returned from injury but could not help the Cornhuskers return to winning form, as the team lost its first six games of the year for the worst start to a season in program history. Martinez's first career win came against Minnesota, where he threw for 276 yards and three passing touchdowns, and ran for another touchdown on the ground in the 53–28 victory. He was named Big Ten Co-Freshman of the Week (with Rondale Moore) for the performance. Martinez earned two more Big Ten Freshman of the Week honors following a loss to Ohio State on November 3 and a victory over Illinois on November 10.

Martinez finished his freshman season with 2,617 passing yards, 17 passing touchdowns, and eight interceptions. He added 629 rushing yards and eight rushing touchdowns on the ground. He finished sixth in the Big Ten Conference in passing yards and total touchdowns, and was fourth in passer rating.

2019
Martinez received high expectations heading into his sophomore season in 2019, earning pre-season honors at Big Ten Media Days and even appearing in Heisman Trophy candidate discussions. However, he struggled mightily, leading Nebraska to a 5–7 record in a disappointing season.

2020 
After a disappointing 2019 campaign and a Covid-19 impacted offseason, Martinez entered the 2020 season under pressure. In the opening game at Ohio State, Martinez went 12-15 for 105 yards passing, and 85 yards and a touchdown on the ground.  After a lackluster performance in the week two loss at Northwestern, head coach Scott Frost decided to start redshirt freshman Luke McCaffery in the upcoming game vs. Penn State. Martinez would return to the field just one game later in the 4th quarter of the Illinois game, after McCaffery threw his third interception of the contest. Martinez would remain the starter for the rest of the season, where he showed improvement from his first two starts. The final game of the season at Rutgers was his best game, where he completed 24 of 28 passes for 255 yards, 1 touchdown, 2 interceptions. In that game he also had an additional 181 rushing yards, with 2 rushing touchdowns.

In seven games, Martinez finished his abbreviated junior season with 1,055 passing yards, 4 passing touchdowns, and three interceptions. He ran for 521 yards (5.7 AVG) and 7 rushing touchdowns.

2021 

In 2021, Adrian Martinez played in 11 games for the Huskers, who went 3-9. He completed 189 of 306 passes for 2,867 yards, 14 touchdowns and 10 interceptions.

On December 2, 2021, Adrian Martinez entered the transfer portal with one year of eligibility remaining.

On December 16, 2021 Adrian Martinez announced he would be transferring to Kansas State for his final year.

Statistics

References

External links
Nebraska Cornhuskers bio

2000 births
Living people
Sportspeople from Fresno, California
Players of American football from California
American football quarterbacks
Nebraska Cornhuskers football players
Kansas State Wildcats football players